(November 20, 1932 – March 10, 1997) was a Japanese kabuki actor. Born , son of kabuki actor Nakamura Tokizō III, he entered kabuki and became the first in the kabuki tradition to take the name Nakamura Kinnosuke. He took on his guild name (yagō) Yorozuya as his surname in 1971.

In addition to his kabuki activity, Kinnosuke had an extensive film career. A specialist in jidaigeki, Kinnosuke appeared in more than 140 films. These include a 1957 Mito Kōmon and a 1961 appearance as the title character in the Toei Company's Miyamoto Musashi series (a role he reprised in 1962, 1963, 1964, and 1965, and again in 1971). A versatile actor, he has played as many as seven characters in a single film. In various productions of Chūshingura, he also portrayed Oyamada Shōzaemon (1956), Asano Naganori (1959), Wakisaka Awaji no Kami (1961), and Ōishi Yoshio (1978). Other appearances include Minamoto no Yoshitsune (1957, 1958, 1962), Tokugawa Iemitsu (1958), Oda Nobunaga (1965), Takeda Shingen (1969), Sakamoto Ryōma (1970), Matsudaira Katamori (1980), and Oda Yūrakusai (1989).

Kinnosuke portrayed Yagyū Munenori multiple times, first on television as the star of the year-long 1971 NHK Taiga drama Haru no Sakamichi, then on the Big Screen in the 1978 film Shogun's Samurai.  His next appearance as Munenori was in a 13 episode TV production entitled Yagyū Shinkage-ryū which aired in 1982. His final appearance as Munenori was in 4 of 5 Yagyu Bugeicho TV movies that aired between 1990 and 1992. From 1973 to 1976, he played Ogami Ittō, the Lone Wolf in the NTV series Kozure Ōkami based on the manga Lone Wolf and Cub. A late-career role was Yamana Sōzen in the Taiga drama Hana no Ran.

Kinnosuke's younger brother Nakamura Katsuo and nephew Nakamura Shidō II are currently active in kabuki, television, and film.

Filmography

Film

 Shinshokoku monogatari (1954, part 1, 2)
 Satomi Hakken-den (1954, part 1-5)
 Mangetsu tanuki-bayashi (1954) - Mametaro / Gen'nosuke
 Shinshokoku monogatari, benikujaku dai-ippen (1954)
 Shinsengumi Oni Taicho (1954)
 Seizoroi Kenka Wakashu (1955) - Benten Kozo Kikunosuke
 Shinshokoku monogatari benikujaku (1955, part 2-4)
 Sezuroi kenkawa kashu (1955)
 Shinshokoku monogatari benikujaku kanketsu-hen (1955)
 Seishun kôro: Umi no wakôdo (1955) - Eiichirô Yamazato
 Beni kujaku (1955)
 Minamoto Yoshitsune (1955)
 Shishi maru ippei (1955)
 Akô rôshi - Ten no maki; Chi no maki (1956) - Shôzaemon Oyamada
 Kaidan Chidori ga fuchi (1956) - Minosuke
 Shinshokoku monogatari (1957, part 1-3)
 Daibosatsu tōge (1957) - Uzuki Hyoma
 Mito kômon (1957)
 Yurei-sen (1957, part 1, 2) - Jirômaru
 Ninkyō Shimizu-minato (1957) - Mori no Ishimatsu
 Genji Kurô Sassôki (1957-1958, part 1, 2) - Genji Kurô
 Edo no meibutsuotoko (1958, part 1) - Isshin Tasuke
 Kaze to onna to tabigarasu (1958) - Ginji
 Daibosatsu tōge - Dai ni bu (1958)
 Onmitsu Shichishoki (1958)
 Isshin Tasuke - Tenka no ichidaiji (1958) - Isshin Tasuke / Tokugawa Iemitsu
 Shimizu Minato no meibutso otoko: Enshūmori no Ishimatsu (1958)
 Obuzo tengu (1958)
 Ninkyo Tokaido (1958) - Onikichi
 Ken wa shitte ita (1958)
 Asama no abarenbo (1958)
 Doku-ganryu Masamune (1959) - Date Masamune
 Binan-jo (1959)
 Daibosatsu tōge - Kanketsu-hen (1959)
 Fuunji Oda Nobunaga (1959)
 Tenka no fuku-shogun (1959)
 Doto no taiketsu (1959)
 Naniwa no koi no monogatari (1959) - Chubei Kameya
 Isshin Tasuke (1959)
 Torimono dochu (1959)
 Abarenbo kyodai (1960)
 Shinran (1960) - Shinran
 Tôei All Star Eiga: Mito Kômon (1960)
 Zoku shinran (1960)
 Mori no Ishimatsu (1960)
 Tokai no kaoyaku (1960) - Jirocho
 Yatarō gasa (1960) - Yataro
 Tonosama (1960) - Yaji kita
 Mori no Ishimatsu (1960)
 Iyemitsu to Hikoza to isshin yasuke (1961)
 Eddoko bugyo tenka o kiru otoko (1961)
 Akō Rōshi (1961) - Wakisaka
 Miyamoto Musashi (1961) - Miyamoto Musashi (Takezo)
 Hangyakuji (1961) - Tokugawa Nobuyasu
 Eddoko hanseiki (1961)
 Wakaki ni ho Jirocho: Tokaido no tsumujikaze (1962)
 Mabuta no haha (1962) - Banba no Chutaro
 Chiisakobe (1962) - Shigetsugu
 Miyamoto Musashi: Hannyazaka no ketto (1962) - Miyamoto Musashi (Takezo)
 Sen-hime to Hideyori (1962) - Toyotomi Hideyori
 Jirochō to kotengu: nagurikomi kōshūji (1962)
 Genji Kurō sassōki: Hiken ageha no chō (1962)
 Otoko ippiki dochuki (1963)
 Bushido, Samurai Saga (1963) - Jirozaemon / Iikura / Sajiemon / Kyutaro / Shuzo / Shingo / Osamu / Susumu
 Miyamoto Musashi: Nitoryu kaigen (1963) - Miyamoto Musashi (Takezo)
 Seki no yatappe (1963)
 Fuji dōzan-koku monogatari (1963)
 Brave Records of the Sanada Clan (1964) - Sasuke
 Miyamoto Musashi: Ichijoji no ketto (1964) - Miyamoto Musashi (Takezo)
 Samé (1964) - Same
 Nihon kyôkaku-den (1964) - Seiji
 Revenge (1964) - Shinpachi Ezaki
 Shark (1964)
 Tokugawa Ieyasu (1965) - Oda Nobunaga
 Hiya-meshi to Osan to Chan (1965) - Daishiro Shibayama (episode1) / Santa (episode 2) / Jyukichi (episode 3)
 Matatabi san ning yakuza (1965) - Kaze-no-Kyutaro
 Miyamoto Musashi: Ganryū-jima no kettō (1965) - Miyamoto Musashi (Takezo)
 Hana to ryu (1965)
 Kutsukake Tokijiro (1966) - yukyo ippiki
 Tange Sazen: Hien iaigiri (1966) - Samanosuke / Tange Sazen
 Hana To Ryu: Do Kâiwan No Kêtto (1966)
 Gion Matsuri (1968) - Shinkichi
 Samurai Banners (1969) - Takeda Shingen
 Goyokin (1969) - Samon Fujimaki
 Shirikurae Magoichi (1969) - Magoichi Saika
 Portrait of Hell (1969) - Lord Horikawa
 Shinsengumi (1969) - Fujita Arima
 Bakumatsu (1970) - Ryoma Sakamoto
 Machibuse (1970) - Heima Ibuki
 Tenka no Abarembō (1970) - Yataro Iwasaki
 Shokon ichidai tenka no abarenbo (1970)
 Shinken shobu (1971) - Musashi Miyamoto
 Akatsuki no chôsen (1971)
 Shogun's Samurai (1978) - Yagyū Munenori
 Ogin-sama (1978)
 The Fall of Ako Castle (1978) - Kuranosuke Ohishi
 Nichiren (1979) - Nichiren
 Sanada Yukimura no Bōryaku (1979) - Tokugawa Ieyasu
 Renegade ninjas (1979)
 Tokugawa ichizoku no houkai (1980) - Matsudaira Katamori (Lord of Aizu)
 Shikake-nin Baian (1981) - Baian Fujieda
 Seishun no mon: Jiritsu hen (1982) - Eiji Niki
 Kita kara minami nishi kara higashi (1983) - Ittô Ogami 
 Tori ni tsubasa kemono ni kiba (1984) - Ogami Itto
 Fugitive Samurai (1984) - Ogami Itto
 Saigo no Bakuto (1985) - Harunobu Kiyoshima
 Kozure Ôkami: osanago no me (1985) - Ittô Ogami
 Death of a Tea Master (1989) - Urakusai Oda
 Minamoto Yoshitsune (TBA)
 Jishi maru ippei (TBA)

Television
 Hiya-meshi to Osanto-chan (1965) – Daishiro Shibayama (episode1)/Santa (episode 2)/Jūkichi (episode 3)
 Haru no Sakamichi (1971) - Yagyū Munenori
 Lone Wolf and Cub (1973-1976) – Ittō Ogami
 Nagasaki Hangachōu (1975) - Hiramatsu Chūshirō
 The Yagyu Conspiracy (1978) – Tokugawa Yoshinao
 Akō Rōshi (1979) – Ōishi Kuranosuke Yoshio/Yoshitaka 
 Sorekara no Musashi (1981) – Miyamoto Musashi
 Yagyū Shinkage-ryū (1982) - Yagyū Munenori
 Musashibō Benkei (1986) – Fujiwara no Hidehira
 Tabaruzaka (1987) – Katsu Kaishū
 Yagyū Bugei-chō (1990–1992) - Yagyū Munenori
 Hana no Ran (1994) – Yamana Sōzen
 Kanpanî (1996) – Himself

Producer
 Sorekara no Musashi (1981) TV series
 Bakumatsu (1970) (associate producer)

Awards and nominations
 In 1958 he won for Best Actor in Isshin Tasuke - Tenka no ichidaiji by the Asia-Pacific Film Festival.
 In 1959 he won the Most Popular Award by the Blue Ribbon Awards.
 In 1964 he won for Best Actor in Bushidô zankoku monogatari by the Blue Ribbon Awards.
 In 1979 he was Nominated for the Award of the Japanese Academy for Best Actor in Yagyû ichizoku no inbô.
 In 1990 he was Nominated for the Award of the Japanese Academy for Best Supporting Actor in Sen no Rikyu.
 In 1996 he was awarded a Lifetime Achievement Award by the Awards of the Japanese Academy.
 In 1998 he was awarded a Special Award by the Awards of the Japanese Academy for his career.
 In 1998 he was awarded a Special Award by the Mainichi Film Concours for his career.

Notes and references

External links

 
 

1932 births
1997 deaths
Male actors from Tokyo
Kabuki actors
Japanese male film actors
Deaths from pneumonia in Japan
Deaths from laryngeal cancer
Deaths from cancer in Japan
20th-century Japanese male actors
Taiga drama lead actors
Recipients of the Order of the Rising Sun, 4th class